Oscar Lemming (11 October 1886 – 30 August 1979) was a Swedish hurdler. He competed in the men's 110 metres hurdles at the 1908 Summer Olympics.

References

1886 births
1979 deaths
Athletes (track and field) at the 1908 Summer Olympics
Athletes (track and field) at the 1912 Summer Olympics
Swedish male hurdlers
Olympic athletes of Sweden
Place of birth missing